The New Zapp IV U is the fourth studio album by the American funk band Zapp, released on October 25, 1985 by Warner Bros. Records. The album contained the song "Computer Love", which reached #8 on the US Billboard R&B chart. The album became the last release before frontman Roger Troutman would focus his efforts on his solo career; their next album, titled Zapp Vibe would be released later in 1989.

In popular culture
The song "Radio People" was featured in the movie Ferris Bueller's Day Off. As well the cover for "I Only Have Eyes For You" was used as a sample in Vektroid's Floral Shoppe, "It Doesn't Really Matter" was Sampled in Phippsy's "You'll Find Love Close to the Music". The album's most popular single, "Computer Love", was also featured in the 1993 cult classic film Menace II Society.

Track listing

Personnel
Roger Troutman: Rhythm and Lead Guitars, Bass, Keyboards, Vocals
Aaron Blackmon: Rhythm and Lead Guitars, Bass
Greg Jackson, Dale DeGroat, Billy Beck, Bernie Worrell: Keyboards
Zapp Troutman: Bass, Keyboards
Damian Black: Drums
Lester Troutman: Drums, Percussion
Larry Troutman, Robert "Kurumba" Jones: Percussion
Carl Cowen, Jerome Derrickson, Michael Warren, Robert Jones: Horns

Charts

Weekly charts

Year-end charts

References

Further reading
 "Bridges Proves It Really Does Matter for Zapp". Back Stage. February 7, 1986. p. 57

1985 albums
Albums produced by Roger Troutman
Warner Records albums
Zapp (band) albums